Bethany Rose Marsh is a mathematician working in the areas of cluster algebras, representation theory of finite-dimensional algebras, homological algebra, tilting theory, quantum groups, algebraic groups, Lie algebras and Coxeter groups. Marsh currently works at the University of Leeds as a Professor of pure mathematics. She was a EPSRC Leadership Fellow from 2008 to 2014. In addition to her duties at the University of Leeds, Marsh was an editor of the Glasgow Mathematical Journal from 2008 to 2013 and served on the London Mathematical Society editorial board from 2014 to 2018.

Awards 

In July 2009, Marsh was awarded the Whitehead Prize by the London Mathematical Society for her work on representation theory, and especially for her research on cluster categories and cluster algebras.

Publications

References

External links 
 

Academics of the University of Leeds
Living people
Whitehead Prize winners
Alumni of the University of Oxford
Algebraists
20th-century British mathematicians
21st-century British mathematicians
British women mathematicians
Year of birth missing (living people)